Adam Neuser (c. 153012 October 1576) was a Protestant pastor of Heidelberg who held Antitrinitarian views.  

Neuser was born in Gunzenhausen and was a popular pastor and theologian in Heidelberg in the 1560s, serving at the Peterskirche and later the Heiliggeistkirche. During the controversy over church discipline that developed in the late 1560s, Neuser became a leading member of the Antidisciplinist, and thus anti-Calvinist, faction led by Thomas Erastus. His disaffection with the ecclesiastical regime perhaps played some role in his doubts concerning orthodox Christian dogma. He wrote letters sternly attacking the doctrine of the trinity. He wrote to the Ottoman Sultan assuring Sultan that he would receive support in Germany if his conquests push him that far. Neuser along with another Antitrinitarian, Johann Sylvan, sought to dialog with the Turks.  Neuser was accused of denying divinity to Jesus Christ and was consequently imprisoned.  His associate, Johann Sylvan, was tortured and beheaded.  Neuser confessed but managed to break out of prison.  He later converted to Islam and traveled to Istanbul where he served the Ottoman Sultan.

It is included in "Antiquities Palatine" which is now in the Archives at Heidelberg. "I, Adam Neuser, a Christian born in Germany and advanced to the dignity of Preacher to the people in Heidelberg, a city where the most learned men at this day in Germany are to be found, do fly for refuge to your majesty with a profound submission conjuring you for the love of God and your Prophet, on whom be peace of God, to receive me into the number of your subjects and those of your people that believe in God. For by the grace of the Omnipotent God, I see, I know, and I believe with my whole that your Doctrine and your Religion are pure, clear and acceptable to God. I am firmly persuaded that my retreat from among the idolatrous Christians will engage many persons of consideration to embrace your belief and your religion, especially since many of the most learned and most considerable amongst them are herein of the same sentiments with me as I shall inform your majesty by word of mouth....Being promoted to the dignity of Preacher in the famous University of Heidelberg by the Elector Palatine who next to the Emperor is the most powerful prince in Germany, I began to weigh maturely within myself the divers dissensions  and divisions of our Christian religion: for so many persons as there are amongst us there are so many opinions and sentiments. I began with abstracting from all the Doctors and interpreters of the Scriptures who have wrote and taught since the days of the Prophet Jesus Christ. I tied myself only to the commandments of Moses and to the Gospel. Then I called upon God inwardly with the a most religious application and prayed him to show me the right way that I may not be in the danger to mislead myself and my hearers. Then it pleased God to reveal to me the "Articles of Invocation of the One only true God", upon which Article I composed a book in which I prove the Doctrine of Jesus Christ did not consist in asserting that he was himself a God as the Christians falsely allege: but that there is only one God who has no son con-substantial with him....."

See also
Matthias Vehe

References

Further reading
Burchill, Christopher J. (1989) The Heidelberg Antitrinitarians. Bibliotheca Dissidentium 11, ed. André Séguenny. Baden-Baden: Editions Valentin Koerner. 
Gunnoe, Charles D. (2011) Thomas Erastus and the Palatinate: A Renaissance Physician in the Second Reformation. Leiden: Brill. 
 (treated in the article with Sylvan)

1530 births
1576 deaths
People from Gunzenhausen
Converts to Islam from Protestantism
Antitrinitarians
German Protestant clergy
German defectors
German Muslims
German former Christians
German emigrants to the Ottoman Empire